"What If" is a song performed by English actress Kate Winslet, recorded for the animated film Christmas Carol: The Movie (2001). Winslet provided the voice of Belle in the feature, which is based on the Charles Dickens classic 1843 novel and also stars Nicolas Cage, Jane Horrocks and Simon Callow. "What If" was written by Wayne Hector and Steve Mac, while production was helmed by the latter. The song is a ballad that follows the film's theme, as Belle laments the end of her and Scrooge's relationship and wonders what could have been. It was the only song to be released from the official movie soundtrack.

News that Winslet was secretly recording the one-off single to vie for the 2001 UK Christmas number one spot was reported in the Daily Mirror. In the event, the song entered the UK Singles Chart at number six, its peak. Elsewhere, "What If" was released to even bigger success; it became a number-one hit in Austria, Flanders, and Ireland whilst also reaching the top ten in Germany, the Netherlands, and Switzerland. Critically acclaimed, the song won the 2002 OGAE Song Contest. At Winslet's request, the proceeds from the single were given to the National Society for the Prevention of Cruelty to Children and Sargent Cancer Care for Children.

Critical reception
Can't Stop the Pop described "What If" as a "ballad of epic proportions", and a "huge, soaring Disney-esque ballad". Barbara Ellen from The Observer said it is "a sweet, trilling, sub-Celine little ditty." British trade paper Music Week wrote that Winslet could sing the track well but noted that her divorce from Jim Threapleton would make the lyrics less "poignant".

Music video
An accompanying music video, which was directed by Paul Donnellon and produced by Chris Horton, shows Winslet walking around an old Victorian house, along with clips from the film.

Track listings
UK CD single
 "What If"
 "The Coventry Carol"
 "What If" (film version)
 "What If" (enhanced video)

UK cassette single
 "What If"
 "The Coventry Carol"
 "What If" (film version)

European CD single
 "What If" (full version)
 "What If" (film version)

Credits and personnel
Credits are adapted from the UK CD single liner notes.

Studios
 Recorded at Air Lyndhurst and Rokstone Studios (London, England)

Personnel

 Kate Winslet – vocals
 Steve Mac – writing, production
 Wayne Hector – writing
 Chris Laws – engineering
 Matt Howe – engineering
 Daniel Pursey – engineering assistant
 Jason Bell – cover photography
 The Red Room – cover design
 Graeme Perkins – music supervisor for Christmas Carol: The Movie soundtrack

Charts

Weekly charts

Year-end charts

Certifications

Cover versions
In 2004, a dance remake of the song was released by Dutch producer Ronald Vos (under the moniker of Ronny V), with Nanda Philipse (from the Dutch gothic metal band Infinite Dawn) providing the vocals.
In 2008, the 2007 X-Factor finalist Rhydian Roberts included a duet of the song with American singer and Broadway actress Idina Menzel on his debut album Rhydian.
Britain's Got Talent 2010 semi-finalist Olivia Archbold performed this song. She came in third place in the semi-finals and lost the judges' votes to Tobias Mead. Due to the performance, "What If" re-entered the UK Singles Charts at number 76 on 6 June 2010.

References

External links
 "Winslet Records a Single" (IMDb news article)
 "Winslet Launches Festive Chart Bid" (BBC News story)

2000s ballads
2001 debut singles
2001 songs
EMI Records singles
Kate Winslet songs
Irish Singles Chart number-one singles
Number-one singles in Austria
Pop ballads
Song recordings produced by Steve Mac
Songs about divorce
Songs about heartache
Songs written by Steve Mac
Songs written by Wayne Hector
Ultratop 50 Singles (Flanders) number-one singles